Glatman is a surname. Notable people with the surname include:

 Daniel Glatman (born 1975), English music manager
 Harvey Glatman (1927–1959), American serial killer, rapist, kidnapper, and robber

See also
 Gladman